Membranoptera is a genus of red algae belonging to the family Delesseriaceae.

The genus has almost cosmopolitan distribution.

Species

Species:

Membranoptera alata 
Membranoptera carpophylla
Membranoptera denticulata

References

Delesseriaceae
Red algae genera